Eric Frank Ripert (born 2 March 1965) is a French chef, author, and television personality specializing in modern French cuisine and noted for his work with seafood.

Ripert's flagship restaurant, Le Bernardin, located in New York City, has been ranked among the best restaurants in the world by culinary magazines and currently ranks No.36 on the annual list of "The World's 50 Best Restaurants". It holds the maximum ratings of four stars from The New York Times and three stars from the Michelin Guide.

Early life and education
Ripert was born in France and learned to cook at a young age from his mother. When he was young, his family moved to Andorra, where he was raised. He later returned to France and attended a culinary school in Perpignan.

Culinary career
At 17 in 1982, he moved to Paris, where he worked for two years at La Tour d'Argent, a famous restaurant that claims to be more than 400 years old. Ripert next worked at Jamin under Joël Robuchon and was soon promoted to Assistant Chef de Partie. In 1985 Ripert left to fulfill his military service, after which he returned to Jamin as Chef Poissonier.

In 1989, Ripert moved to the United States and was hired as a sous chef in the Watergate Hotel's Jean Louis Palladin restaurant. Ripert moved to New York in 1991, working briefly as David Bouley's sous-chef before Maguy and Gilbert Le Coze recruited him as a chef for Le Bernardin. In 1994, Ripert became Le Bernardin's executive chef after Gilbert Le Coze died unexpectedly of a heart attack. The following year, at 29, Ripert earned a four-star rating from The New York Times, and in 1996 he became a part-owner. In the Michelin Guide NYC 2006, Ripert's Le Bernardin was one of four New York City restaurants to be awarded the maximum three Michelin stars for excellence in cuisine. Le Bernardin received four stars from The New York Times four consecutive times, making it the only restaurant to maintain that exquisite status for that length of time and never dropping a star in ten years. Le Bernardin is often referred to as the Temple of Seafood.

Ripert is the Vice Chairman of the board of City Harvest, working to bring together New York's top chefs and restaurateurs to raise funds and increase the quality and quantity of food donations to New York's neediest. In addition, Ripert partnered with The Ritz-Carlton Hotel Company to open Blue in Grand Cayman.

Media career
Ripert has made several guest appearances on cooking-based television shows, including guest judge and assistant chef roles on the second, third, fourth, and fifth seasons of Bravo TV's Top Chef. Ripert had been considered to join season 8 of Top Chef as a permanent judge but bowed out when his employee Jen Caroll was selected as a contestant again. Ripert was good friends with Anthony Bourdain and appeared in many episodes of A Cook's Tour, Anthony Bourdain: No Reservations and Anthony Bourdain: Parts Unknown. In September 2009, Avec Eric, Ripert's first TV show, debuted on PBS stations and ran for two seasons, earning two Daytime Emmy Awards: Outstanding Culinary Program (2011) and Outstanding Achievement in Main Title and Graphic Design (2010). Avec Eric returned for a third season on the Cooking Channel in February 2015 and is now available through iTunes and Netflix. Ripert has launched a series of brief online cooking videos called "Get Toasted" on his website, focusing on easy and quick meals that can be prepared and cooked in minutes with a toaster oven. In the series, he uses a somewhat high-end brick-oven-based toaster oven produced by Cuisinart.

In 2010, he played himself in the television show Treme on HBO (season 1 episode 5), alongside David Chang, Wylie Dufresne and Tom Colicchio. He returned in his cameo role in Season 2, in multiple episodes.

Books 
In the fall of 2008, Ripert published On the Line, his second cookbook with Artisan, which in 2002 published A Return to Cooking, a collaboration between Ripert, photographers Shimon and Tammar Rothstein, artist Valentino Cortazar, and writer Michael Ruhlman that was selected by Newsweek as one of its best books of the season.  Ripert's first cookbook, Le Bernardin – Four Star Simplicity (Clarkson Potter), was published in 1998, and in 2014, Ripert released his newest cookbook, My Best: Eric Ripert (Alain Ducasse Publishing). In 2016, he published his memoir: 32 Yolks: From My Mother's Table to Working the Line (Random House), which appeared on The New York Times bestseller list.

Philanthropic activity
Ripert is the chair of City Harvest's Food Council. In this capacity, he works to bring together New York's top chefs, restaurateurs, and others in the food community to assist City Harvest in its mission to raise funds and increase the quantity and quality of food donations. "City Harvest, a non-profit organization founded in 1982, is the world's first and New York City's only food rescue program. City Harvest exists to end hunger in New York City communities through food rescue and distribution, education, and other practical, innovative solutions."

For three years, Ripert has hosted the Tibetan Aid Project's Taste & Tribute New York benefit dinner and auction at his Manhattan restaurant, Le Bernardin. "Funds raised at the annual Taste & Tribute benefit dinners help support efforts to restore Tibetan-language texts to libraries all over the Himalayan region. So far, this project has led to the distribution of nearly two million traditional Buddhist texts—one of the largest free book distributions in history.

Published works
 Le Bernardin Cookbook (co-authored with Maguy Le Coze) (1998), 
 A Return to Cooking (co-authored with Michael Ruhlman) (2002), 
 On the Line: The Stations, the Heat, the Cooks, the Costs, the Chaos, and the Triumphs (co-authored with Christine Muhlke) (November 2008), 
 Avec Eric: A Culinary Journey with Eric Ripert (2010), 
 My Best: Eric Ripert (2014)
 32 Yolks: From My Mother's Table to Working the Line (17 May 2016) with Veronica Chambers

Awards
 "Best Restaurant in America" (1997) by GQ "Best Food in New York City" (2000–2007) by Zagat
 "Outstanding Restaurant of the Year" (1998) by the James Beard Foundation
 "Top Chef in New York City" (1998) by the James Beard Foundation
 "Outstanding Service Award" (1999) by the James Beard Foundation
 "Outstanding Chef of the Year" (2003) by the James Beard Foundation

Personal life
Ripert and his wife Sandra (née Nieves) have a son.

On 8 June 2018, Ripert was traveling with his friend, American TV personality and culinary connoisseur Anthony Bourdain, who was working on an episode of Anthony Bourdain: Parts Unknown in Strasbourg, France. Ripert found Bourdain dead from an apparent suicide by hanging in Bourdain's hotel room at Kaysersberg-Vignoble.

Ripert stated on an episode of Bourdain's previous show, Anthony Bourdain: No Reservations'' that he had become a Buddhist.

References

External links
 Profile at Great Chefs
 Personal Blog
 Biography at CuisineNet
 in depth video interview w/ Eric
 Biography at Global Gourmet
 iVillage's Secret Sauce: Eric Ripert's Warm Peekytoe-Maryland Lump "Crab Cake"
 iVillage's Secret Sauce: Eric Ripert's Grilled Trout with Sauce Vierge and Potato and Leek"
 Westend Bistro, Washington, DC
 Chef’s Table: Drinking with Eric Ripert

1965 births
Living people
People from Antibes
French chefs
American male chefs
Chefs of French cuisine
Head chefs of Michelin starred restaurants
French emigrants to Andorra
French emigrants to the United States
People from New York City
James Beard Foundation Award winners